Wild in the Streets is a 1968 film.

Wild in the Streets may also refer to:
"Wild in the Streets", a 1973 single by Garland Jeffreys 
Wild in the Streets (Circle Jerks album), a 1982 album by the punk rock band Circle Jerks and its title track (a cover of the Garland Jeffreys song)
Wild in the Streets (Helix album), a 1987 album by the hard rock band Helix and its title track
Recruits – Wild in the Streets, an album by Thor
"Wild in the Streets", a song by Bon Jovi from Slippery When Wet
Wild in the Streets, a 2012 documentary by Peter Baxter